Jalilabad District is one of the 66 districts of Azerbaijan. It is located in the south-east of the country and belongs to the Lankaran-Astara Economic Region. The district borders the districts of Masally, Yardimli, Bilasuvar, and Neftchala. Its capital and largest city is Jalilabad. As of 2020, the district had a population of 225,300.

Geography

Territory 
The territory of the district primarily consists of plains and low mountains. The altitude of some mountains in the east is below sea level. The climate is mild with dry summers. The average amount of annual precipitation is 400–600mm. The Bolgarchay, Misharchay, Injachay, Goytapachay, and other rivers flow through the region. Soils here are alluvial-meadow, chestnut, mountainous brown, forest soils and others. Forests occupy . Mammals such as rabbit, wild boar, badger, wolf, fox, jackal, beaver, inhabit the region along with birds such as eagle, crow, lark, duck, coot, pheasant, stork, bustard.

Natural resources include oil-and-gas fields, lime, clay, sand and stone deposits. Total area of productive lands is 661,2 km2, area of useless agricultural lands is 8,16 km2. There are 2 cities in the district, Jalilabad and Göytəpə.

History 

The town of Hamashara, which was located in the Jalilabad region, belongs to the 2nd millennium BC. The city was surrounded by a  fort. After the Arabs invaded the territory, the city of Hamashara was collapsed and in subsequent periods the city of Hasilly was established. As a result of the relocation of Russians to Azerbaijan in the 1930s, the city of Astarkhanbazar, where Azerbaijanis and Russians lived together, became the center of the region.

The district was established on August 8, 1930. Until July 2, 1967, . it was called Astarkhanbazar. Its name changed on June 2, 1967, to Jalilabad in honor of Azerbaijani writer-playwright Jalil Mammadguluzadeh. On May 26, 1964, Jalilabad joined Bilasuvar administrative-territorial unit. On January 6, 1965, it again became an independent region.

In 1999 more than 190 municipalities were established in the district. 841 people took part in the election of the municipalities.

There are 50 historical and archaeological monuments such as the remains of the ancient cities Bajirevan and Mughan, Alikomektepe and Misharchay residential areas, the Kazan lodge, the Bajiravan mounds, Gurudere residential area from the 4th millennium B.C.,  Jinlitepe which is from the Bronze Age,  and Pirakhanjar, Zoroastrian cabins in the district.

Economy 
The main spheres of the regional economy are cotton growing, potato growing and animal breeding. About  of area is used for cattle-breeding pastures. Planted lands in the region cover . Grains, potatoes, and viticulture in the economy of the Jalilabad region are the main ones. In addition, vegetables, sunflower and corn are grown in the territory.

In 2017 the volume of gross domestic product increased by 4.8 times compared to 2003 and by 62.6% compared to 2016. 7,244,000 manat industrial output was produced in the region, which is 11.4 times more than in 2003.

In the same year, 282,376,000 manat worth of agricultural products was produced, of which 139,864,000 manats or 49.5 percent from crops and 142,512,000 512 manats or 50.5 percent from livestock.

In addition, 23 thousand tons of meat, 82.4 thousand tons of milk and 41.3 million eggs were produced. 222 thousand cattle and 624572 birds are fed in private farms. Also, 3635 tons of poultry meat was sold by "Jalilabad-broiler" OJSC in 2017.

There are about 250 states, 800+ private and 5 foreign enterprises operating in the region. The largest ones are center of forest preserve and restoration, “Avtodəmir” JSC, Irrigation Department, Melioservice, Regional experiment station, "Kənd-Nəqliyyat" JSC, "Kərpic zavodu" JSC, "Kristal" Ltd, "Dalğa-94", "Nuranə" medical center, “Xalçaçılıq Mərkəzi”, "Rizvan" and “Duyaz” companies.

There are 5 city and 3 rural health clinics in the region with 176 doctors and 528 midwives in 40 outpatient clinics.

Tourism 
The territory of the Jalilabad region is appropriate for hunting. It is allowed to hunt aquatic birds on designated certain hunting farms. There is also a small local history museum, park, hotel and motel. "Kral" recreation zone is functioning in Jalilabad city.

Media, education and culture 
Jalilabad region has its own TV and radio stations, and newspapers such as “Yeni gun”, "Sozun ishigi" and "Munasibet". “Yeni gun” has been published since 1932. The "Sozun ishigi" and "Munasibet" newspapers began their operation between 2003 and 2004

There are 18 infant schools, 129 general education schools, 2 vocational and secondary schools, and a higher school in the district. In 2010 Ilham Aliyev took part in the opening ceremony of a chess school in Jalilabad city.

There are 2 music schools, 43 clubs, 64 libraries, an art gallery, and parks in the district, a centralized library with 601,893 books, regional history and ethnography museum with 2,123 exhibits, a regional state art gallery with 137 exhibits, and 50 historical and cultural monuments in the region.

Demographics 
According to the State Statistics Committee, as of 2018, the population of city was 219,500, which increased by 47,500 persons (about 27 percent) from 172,000 persons in 2000. 110,700 of total population are men and 108,800 are women. More than 28.7 percent of the population (about 63,200 persons) consists of young people and teenagers aged 14–29. 219,286 are Azerbaijani, 130 Russian, 15 Turkish, 14 Tatars, 12 Ukrainian, 21 Talyshs and 22 other nationals.

Notable natives 
 Mustafa Nuriyev – general-major
 Javad Gasimov - Head of the Staff of the National Defense of Azerbaijan
 Gabil Guliyev - National artists of Azerbaijan
 Nuraddin Mehdikhanli - National artists of Azerbaijan
 Teymur Mustafayev - Honoured artist of Azerbaijan
 Mansure Musayeva - Hero of the Socialist Labour
 Gulkhara Mehdiyeva - Hero of the Socialist Labour
 Musret Mammadov - Hero of the Socialist Labour
 Mharram Aliyev - Hero of the Socialist Labour
 Boukkhan Mammadov - Hero of the Socialist Labour
Sahib Ahadov - European Champion 2019 and silver medalist of World Championship 2018

Gallery

References

 
Districts of Azerbaijan